Showb Mahalleh (also Romanized as Showb Maḩalleh and Shūb Maḩalleh) is a village in Gatab-e Shomali Rural District, Gatab District, Babol County, Mazandaran Province, Iran. At the 2006 census, its population was 453, in 117 families.

References 

Populated places in Babol County